Carpanta Hambrón, or as better known, Carpanta, is the name of a Spanish character featured in the comic strips and comic books of the same name created in 1947 by José Escobar.  The comics focus on Carpanta's perpetual hunger and his usually failed attempts of satiating it.

The comic series stars Carpanta as the main protagonist and Protasio as Carpanta's friend, along with cameos from other comics such as Petra from the comic book series Petra, criada para todo.

Escobar created Carpanta to symbolize the misery in postwar Spain. It was first published in the 4th number of the Spanish weekly illustrated magazine Pulgarcito, being the first strip Trece en la Mesa (Thrirteen at the table).

Publication history

1940s 
The first apparition of the character was made in the 4th number of the Spanish illustrated magazine Pulgarcito in 1947.

1950s

1960s

1970s

1980s

1990s

2000s 
Throughout the 2000s, older stories from the then Editorial Bruguera continued to be published in some newer comic book compilations.

Characterisation 
Carapanta is drawn as a virtually bald character, wearing an undefined elongated hat in the character's earlier versions, a black tie, a black-striped shirt, red trousers and a black jacket. The character in its later versions was drawn with a boater hat with a single red stripe instead

List of works featuring Carpanta

Comic books 
Super Carpanta series, from 1977 to 1981.

Clásicos del Humor series, Carpanta I and Carpanta II. 2009

Magazines 
Pulgarcito, from 1947 to 1986.

Other media

Bibliography 
 Escobar, Josep. Carpanta I. Edited by Ediciones B.S.A and RBA Coleccionables, vol. 1, RBA, 2008. .

See also 
 Pulgarcito
 Spanish comics

References

Spanish comics titles
Spanish comic strips
1947 comics debuts
Comics characters introduced in 1947
Fictional Spanish people
Gag-a-day comics
Spanish comics characters
Comics adapted into television series